Uwe Jahn (born 29 September 1954 in Berlin) is a German football coach.

During the mid-1990s, Jahn had two spells as manager of Tennis Borussia Berlin, but couldn't stop them from being relegated from the 1993–94 2. Fußball-Bundesliga.

Since April 1996, Jahn has been a coach for the Hamburg Football Association.

References

External links 
 

1954 births
Living people
Sportspeople from Berlin
German football managers
Tennis Borussia Berlin managers